Arturo Juan Rodríguez Pérez-Reverte (born 30 April 1989) is a Spanish professional footballer who plays for Deportivo La Coruña as a forward.

Club career
Born in Cartagena, Murcia, Arturo began playing as a senior with local CD Bala Azul in the 2008–09 season, in Tercera División. In 2009, he moved to FC Cartagena and was assigned to the reserves in the same category.

In July 2011 Arturo first arrived in Segunda División B, signing with newly formed CF La Unión, scoring 11 goals in the club's first and only season of existence. On 30 June of the following year, he agreed to a contract with another reserve team, Getafe CF B also in division three.

On 8 July 2013, Arturo joined fellow third tier side La Roda CF. On 30 December, he signed for Córdoba CF in Segunda División, after being the Castilian-Manchegan's topscorer with 15 goals in only 19 appearances.

Arturo made his professional debut on 4 January 2014, playing the last 21 minutes and scoring the last of a 2–0 home success over Recreativo de Huelva. He contributed with 19 appearances and two goals, as the Andalusians returned to La Liga after a 42-year absence.

On 15 July 2014 Arturo was loaned to AD Alcorcón, also in the second level. After appearing rarely, he terminated his loan on 7 January of the following year, and moved to fellow league team UE Llagostera hours later, also in a temporary deal.

On 20 January 2016, after spending the first half of the campaign with Córdoba, Arturo was loaned to Dundee until June; he totalled only five games for the Dees, all as a substitute. On 13 July, he returned to Cartagena, now for the main squad in the third level, after agreeing to a two-year contract.

Arturo subsequently spent the remainder of his career in the third division, representing UCAM Murcia CF, CE Sabadell FC, CD Atlético Baleares, San Sebastián and Deportivo La Coruña.

Personal life
Arturo's uncle, Arturo Pérez-Reverte, is a novelist and member of the Royal Spanish Academy.

References

External links

1989 births
Living people
Sportspeople from Cartagena, Spain
Spanish footballers
Footballers from the Region of Murcia
Association football forwards
Segunda División players
Segunda División B players
Tercera División players
FC Cartagena footballers
CF La Unión players
Getafe CF B players
La Roda CF players
Córdoba CF players
AD Alcorcón footballers
UE Costa Brava players
UCAM Murcia CF players
CE Sabadell FC footballers
CD Atlético Baleares footballers
UD San Sebastián de los Reyes players
Scottish Professional Football League players
Dundee F.C. players
Spanish expatriate footballers
Spanish expatriate sportspeople in Scotland
Expatriate footballers in Scotland